Michael W. Vannier (born January 12, 1949) is a radiologist in Chicago.

On July 19, 1983, M. Vannier (Mallinckrodt Institute of Radiology, St. Louis) and his co-workers J. Marsh (Cleft Palate and Craniofacial Deformities Institute, St. Louis Children's Hospital) and J. Warren (McDonnell Aircraft Company) published the first three-dimensional reconstruction of single CT slices of the human head.

References

External links 
 Homepage Michael W. Vannier
 Laudatio on the occasion of the 25th anniversary of a three-dimensional reconstruction of a computed tomography

1949 births
American neurosurgeons
American radiologists
Living people